Al-Jaladiyya was a Palestinian Arab village in the Gaza Subdistrict. It was depopulated during the 1948 Arab-Israeli War on July 8, 1948, by the Giv'ati Brigade. It was located 34 kilometres northeast of Gaza.

The Crusades built a castle in the village. There was a school located in the village mosque (built 1890), and when it opened its doors in 1945 it had an enrollment of 43 students.

References

Bibliography

   (p. 418, p.424,  cited in Khalidi, 1992, p. 113) 
  
  (p. 85)

 (p. 148)
 
 

   (p. 270 )
  p.52
 (Robinson and Smith, 1841, vol 3, Appendix 2, p. 118)
  (In 1160: granted by Amalric, count of Ascalon to the Holy Sepulchre: p. 93, # 356)

External links
Welcome To al-Jaladiyya
al-Jaladiyya, Zochrot
Survey of Western Palestine, Map 16:   IAA, Wikimedia commons
Jaladiyya from the Khalil Sakakini Cultural Center

Arab villages depopulated during the 1948 Arab–Israeli War
District of Gaza